"Here, There and Everywhere" is a song by the English rock band the Beatles from their 1966 album Revolver. A love ballad, it was written by Paul McCartney and credited to Lennon–McCartney. McCartney includes it among his personal favourites of the songs he has written. In 2000, Mojo ranked it 4th in the magazine's list of the greatest songs of all time.

Inspiration and background
McCartney began writing "Here, There and Everywhere" at Lennon's house in Weybridge, in early June, while waiting for Lennon to wake up. McCartney recalled: "I sat out by the pool on one of the sun chairs with my guitar and started strumming in E. And soon [I] had a few chords, and I think by the time he'd woken up, I had pretty much written the song, so we took it indoors and finished it up."

When discussing his song "Here, There and Everywhere", McCartney has often cited the Beach Boys' "God Only Knows", his favourite pop song of all time, as a source of inspiration. In 1990, McCartney told Beach Boys biographer David Leaf that it was "just the introduction that's influenced [by the Beach Boys]", referring to the harmonies he and Lennon devised for the opening lines of "Here, There and Everywhere". McCartney added that, with this style of introduction, they wanted to capture the "old-fashioned" idea of a preamble to the song.

Musical structure
Author Kenneth Womack describes "Here, There and Everywhere" as a romantic ballad "about living in the here and now" and "fully experiencing the conscious moment". The verse is based on an ascending major chord sequence, while the middle eight (being 4 bars in fact), which modulates to the relative major of the tonic – if it had been minor, creates a telling contrast. The introduction beginning "To lead a better life" opens in the key of G and involves a I–iii–III–ii–V7 chord progression. The III (B chord) on "I need my love to be here" (arpeggiated in the melody line) is a dissonant substitute for the more predictable VI (E7) that would normally lead to the ii (Am) chord. Music critic Richie Unterberger considers that this "dramatic opening [lyric]" contains "an almost philosophical undertone of humility, acknowledging that the singer needs his woman not just to be happy, but also to be a better person".

The verse opens strongly anchored on "Here" in the key of G (with simultaneous I (G chord) and melody G note) and moves equally predictably to a I–ii–iii–IV chord shift (G–Am–Bm–C) through "making each day of the year". This repeats on "Changing my life with a wave"; but immediately after (in bar 5) the song indeed changes on "of her hand". It goes down six semitones from the IV (C chord) to a vii (Fm) [adding a non-G scale C#] then a V-of-vi (B7) chord [adding a non-G scale D] which briefly modulates towards a new tonic E minor. McCartney mostly sings a B note ("of her hand") over both Fm, where it is the eleventh, and the B7, where it is the tonic. When the sequence is repeated ("nobody can"), McCartney sings both B and C over the Fm, the C natural producing a tritone.

The harmonic fascination with the bridge segment beginning "I want her everywhere" is that at that point the key centre does go "everywhere". It shifts via an F7 chord (a VII in the old G key and a V7 in the new B key) to a I–vi–ii (B–Gm–Cm) chord progression in B major. It then shifts again via a D7 chord (a III7 in the old B key and a V7 in the new Gm key) to G minor where we go through a i–iv (Gm–Cm chord) progression. Finally the pivot of D7 takes us back to the G major tonic and reinforcing G melody note of "Everywhere".

Rolling Stone has noted: "The tune's chord sequence bears Brian Wilson's influence, ambling through three related keys without ever fully settling into one, and the modulations – particularly the one on the line 'changing my life with a wave of her hand' – deftly underscore the lyrics, inspired by McCartney's girlfriend, actress Jane Asher."

Recording
The Beatles recorded "Here, There and Everywhere" towards the end of the sessions for their 1966 album Revolver. The band worked on the song at Abbey Road Studios over three session dates – on 14, 16 and 17 June. Before carrying out overdubs, they taped 13 takes before achieving a satisfactory basic track.

The recording is noted for its layered backing vocals, which McCartney, Lennon and George Harrison spent much of the three days attempting to perfect. McCartney mentioned in the 1989 radio series McCartney on McCartney that the vocals were meant to have a Beach Boys sound; he has also said that he was trying to sing it in the style of Marianne Faithfull. McCartney's lead vocal on the recording is multi-tracked. In his book Revolution in the Head, Ian MacDonald also comments on Harrison's lead guitar part being given a mandolin-like tone via a Leslie speaker effect, before it adopts a "horn-like timbre" for the song's ending.

Release and reception
"Here, There and Everywhere" was released in August 1966 as the fifth track on Revolver, sequenced between Harrison's Indian-styled "Love You To", and the children's song "Yellow Submarine". Writing of its positioning in the running order, music critic Tim Riley says that "Here, There and Everywhere" "domesticates" the "eroticisms" of "Love You To", and he praises the composition as "the most perfect song" that McCartney had ever written. In his review for AllMusic, Richie Unterberger describes "Here, There and Everywhere" as one of its author's "outstanding contribution[s]" to the genre of "love ballads", and a song with "the sound of an instant standard". Unterberger comments on the recording: "The delicacy of the execution is exquisite, the sensual imagery more explicit, the sense of desire and fulfillment tangible."

Less impressed, Ian MacDonald admired the "ingenuity of the music", but concluded that "for all its soft-focus charm, the song's overall effect is chintzy and rather cloying." In his chapter on Revolver in the book The Album, James Perone describes "Here, There and Everywhere" as a "mid 1960s love ballad that could find its way into the set list for bands at a senior prom" and a track that to some listeners appears "syrupy and mushy". Chris Coplan of Consequence of Sound pairs it with "Got to Get You into My Life" as songs that are "seemingly out of place" on Revolver amid the overtly psychedelic and experimental music that typifies the album.

In his authorised biography, Many Years from Now, McCartney names "Here, There and Everywhere" as one of his personal favourites. Beatles producer George Martin also highlighted it among his favourite McCartney songs. Lennon reportedly told McCartney that "Here, There and Everywhere" was "the best tune" on Revolver. In a 1980 interview for Playboy magazine, Lennon described it as "one of my favourite songs of the Beatles".

In 2000, Mojo placed "Here, There and Everywhere" at number 4 on its list of the greatest songs of all time. In April 2004, Rolling Stone ranked it 25th out of the "100 Greatest Beatles Songs". Art Garfunkel has cited this as his all-time favourite pop song.

McCartney re-recorded the song for his 1984 soundtrack album Give My Regards to Broad Street and also performed it for MTV in 1991, released on Unplugged (The Official Bootleg).

Cover versions
Unterberger highlights Emmylou Harris among the notable artists who have recorded "Here, There and Everywhere". Harris' version became a minor hit in 1976, reaching number 65 on the Billboard Hot 100 and number 13 on the Adult Contemporary chart in the United States. It reached number 30 in the Official UK music chart. Frank Ocean interpolated its lyrics on his 2016 album Blonde, for which Lennon–McCartney received a writing credit.

Bruce Welch of the Shadows claimed in his autobiography that McCartney offered the tune to Shadows lead guitarist Hank Marvin before the Beatles' recording. Marvin eventually released an instrumental version of the song on his 2007 album Guitar Man.

Lennon's son Sean Ono Lennon and Elvis Costello both covered the song in 2022 in celebration of McCartney's 80th birthday.

In popular culture
In the TV series Friends, this song is played on steel drums when Phoebe Buffay walks down the aisle during her wedding. It was the second time a song written by McCartney was used in a wedding sequence in the series, the first being "My Love" when Chandler and Monica married.

Gary Sparrow sings the song at the piano in an episode of Goodnight Sweetheart.

Geoff Emerick, who engineered many of the Beatles' recordings, used the title of the song for his 2006 memoir Here, There, and Everywhere: My Life Recording the Music of The Beatles.

Personnel
According to Ian MacDonald:

 Paul McCartney – double-tracked lead vocals, rhythm guitar, bass, finger-snaps
 John Lennon – backing vocals, finger-snaps
 George Harrison – lead guitar, backing vocals, finger-snaps
 Ringo Starr – drums, finger-snaps

References

Bibliography

External links

Handwritten lyrics of Here, There and Everywhere by Paul McCartney at the British Library
 
 Sissel's cover of "Here, There And Everywhere"
 

1966 songs
1976 singles
1960s ballads
Pop ballads
Songs written by Lennon–McCartney
The Beatles songs
Petula Clark songs
Perry Como songs
John Denver songs
Bobbie Gentry songs
Jay and the Americans songs
Emmylou Harris songs
Sissel Kyrkjebø songs
The Lettermen songs
Andy Williams songs
Song recordings produced by George Martin
Songs published by Northern Songs
Rock ballads
British soft rock songs
Johnny Mathis songs